If I Don't Stay the Night is the second studio album from American country singer Mindy McCready. The album was released on November 4, 1997 via BNA Records. The album peaked at number 12 on the Billboard Top Country Albums chart and featured three singles, "What If I Do", "The Other Side of This Kiss", and "You'll Never Know". The album sold 825,000 copies and was certified gold by the RIAA, despite not producing a Top Ten country hit. The track "Oh Romeo" crossed over the United Kingdom, where it reached #41 on the UK Singles Chart. This album is unavailable on streaming services for unknown reasons.

Track listing

International Tracklist

Personnel
From liner notes.

Musicians
Bob Bellamy - hammer dulcimer
Richard "Spady" Brannan - bass guitar
Kathy Burdick - background vocals
Larry Byrom - acoustic guitar
Paul Franklin - pedal steel guitar
Rob Hajacos - fiddle
Dann Huff - electric guitar
Jeff King - electric guitar
Michael Landau - electric guitar
Paul Leim - drums, percussion
B. James Lowry - acoustic guitar
David Malloy - background vocals
Larry Marrs - background vocals
Brent Mason - electric guitar
Mindy McCready - lead vocals
Jimmy Nichols - keyboards, background vocals, string arrangements on tracks 7, 9, and 11

Additional background vocals on "Oh Romeo": Cynthia French, Randi Michaels, Kim Parent, Melissa Ashworth

Technical
Derek Bason - recording
Kevin Beamish - recording, mixing
David Malloy - production
Denny Purcell - mastering

Charts

Weekly charts

Year-end charts

References

1997 albums
BNA Records albums
Mindy McCready albums
Albums produced by David Malloy